Frozen Niagara Falls is a double album by the American musical project Prurient, the performing name of Dominick Fernow. It was released on May 12, 2015 through Profound Lore Records. Leading up to its official release date, Frozen Niagara Falls was promoted with online streams of "Dragonflies to Sew You Up" and "Greenpoint".

Background and composition
Fernow originally intended to create Frozen Niagara Falls with sounds from non-musical acoustic sources with no electronics at all, including materials being broken and destroyed. Regarding the concept, he said in an interview with The Quietus:

The album was originally conceived in Italy and was eventually recorded in New York City, in what Fernow deemed "spirit of homelessness".

Critical reception

Frozen Niagara Falls received widespread acclaim from music critics. At Metacritic (a review aggregator site which assigns a normalized rating out of 100 from music critics), based on 16 critics, the album has received a score of 84/100, indicating "universal acclaim". Pitchfork wrote that "With Niagara, he's taken strengths from his entire oeuvre to reach deeper into himself and produce what may be his best record yet, one that brings all the fulfillment of noise and transcends them all the same. [...] He offers an endless, probing self-exploration that simply isn't found in noise, metal, hardcore, power electronics, whatever harsh music you can think of."

The Quietus were positive in their assessment of the album, writing that "Rushing static, distant growls, and harsh noises duel on top of the dramatic central theme, yet it remains more beautiful and tragic than harsh or angry. It's a compellingly emotional and driven tone that permeates several of the album's key tracks."

Track listing
Music arranged by Dominick Fernow, Kris Lapke and Arthur Rizk; lyrics by Fernow.

Personnel
Frozen Niagara Falls adapted from CD liner notes.

Music and lyrics
 Jean Feraca – additional lyric editing 
 Dominick Fernow – arranging, lyrics
 Kris Lapke – arranging; additional: synthesizer, electronics, fretless bass, field recording, percussion
 Jim Mroz – additional field recording
 Arthur Rizk – arranging; additional: electric guitar, twelve-string guitar, acoustic guitar, fretless bass, field recording, percussion

Production
 Paul Corley – mastering
 Dominick Fernow – production, mixing
 Kris Lapke – production, mixing
 Arthur Rizk – production, mixing

Artwork and packaging
 Becka Diamond – cover photography, additional photography
 Dominick Fernow – art direction, design, additional photography
 Adam Gordon – untitled sculpture and painting
 Matt Kenny – comedy masks
 Adam Marnie – red cross
 Nikolay Saveliev – art direction, design
 Scott Bryan Wilson – additional text editing

References

External links
 Frozen Niagara Falls on Bandcamp

2015 albums
Prurient albums
Profound Lore Records albums